Villanueva Club de Fútbol is a Spanish football team based in Villanueva de Gállego, in the autonomous community of Aragon. Founded in 1974 it plays in Regional Preferente, holding home games at Estadio Nuevo Enrique Porta, with a capacity for 2,000 spectators.

Season to season

19 seasons in Tercera División

References

External links
Official website 
Futbolme team profile  

Football clubs in Aragon
Association football clubs established in 1974
1974 establishments in Spain